Breda-Prinsenbeek is a railway station located in Prinsenbeek near Breda, Netherlands. The station was opened in 1988 and is located on the Breda–Rotterdam railway. The station is currently operated by Nederlandse Spoorwegen.

Destinations

These are some of the destinations that are possible to reach from Breda-Prinsenbeek:

Breda, Dordrecht, Rotterdam and The Hague (Den Haag).

For more major destinations it is best to travel to Breda. These include:

Roosendaal, Tilburg, 's-Hertogenbosch, Nijmegen, Arnhem, Eindhoven, Helmond and Venlo. Travelling to Dordrecht will allow a connection on to a faster train to Rotterdam, The Hague, Leiden and Amsterdam.

Train services
The following services currently call at Breda-Prinsenbeek:
2x per hour local service (sprinter) The Hague - Rotterdam - Dordrecht - Breda (1x per hour during evenings and weekends)

External links
NS page for Breda-Prinsenbeek  

Prinsenbeek
Railway stations opened in 1988
Railway stations on the Staatslijn I